Tintah is a city in Traverse County, Minnesota, United States. The population was 67 at the 2020 census.

Geography

Minnesota State Highway 9 serves as a main route in the community, and Minnesota State Highway 55 is nearby.

Demographics

2010 census
As of the census of 2010, there were 63 people, 29 households, and 17 families residing in the city. The racial makeup of the city was 98.4% White and 1.6% from two or more races.

There were 29 households, of which 24.1% had children under the age of 18 living with them, 37.9% were married couples living together, 13.8% had a female householder with no husband present, 6.9% had a male householder with no wife present, and 41.4% were non-families. 41.4% of all households were made up of individuals, and 24.1% had someone living alone who was 65 years of age or older. The average household size was 2.17 and the average family size was 2.82.

The median age in the city was 44.3 years. 27% of residents were under the age of 18; 6.2% were between the ages of 18 and 24; 19.1% were from 25 to 44; 23.8% were from 45 to 64; and 23.8% were 65 years of age or older. The gender makeup of the city was 57.1% male and 42.9% female.

2000 census
As of the census of 2000, there were 79 people, 37 households, and 21 families residing in the city. The racial makeup of the city was 100.00% White.

There were 37 households, out of which 24.3% had children under the age of 18 living with them, 43.2% were married couples living together, 10.8% had a female householder with no husband present, and 43.2% were non-families. 40.5% of all households were made up of individuals, and 27.0% had someone living alone who was 65 years of age or older. The average household size was 2.14 and the average family size was 2.86.

In the city, the population was spread out, with 26.6% under the age of 18, 5.1% from 18 to 24, 26.6% from 25 to 44, 12.7% from 45 to 64, and 29.1% who were 65 years of age or older. The median age was 40 years. For every 100 females, there were 92.7 males. For every 100 females age 18 and over, there were 87.1 males.

The median income for a household in the city was $15,500, and the median income for a family was $13,125. Males had a median income of $18,750 versus $0 for females. The per capita income for the city was $13,536. There were 36.8% of families and 23.4% of the population living below the poverty line, including no under eighteens and 26.1% of those over 64.

References

Cities in Traverse County, Minnesota
Cities in Minnesota
Dakota toponyms